HeartB is a South Korean boy band formed by MarblePop Entertainment. The group consists of four members: Dojin, Jinwook, Chanyeong, and Byulha. They start their pre-debut activity releasing single "Shine" on December 3, 2014 and then made their official debut with mini album "Remember" on May 6, 2015.

History

Pre-debut 
HeartB started their activity with the release of short teaser for their first digital single "Shine" on November 30, 2014. The video teaser featured a short narration by announcer Choi Hee. The single "Shine" was released on December 3, 2014 as digital single without promotional music video or physical copy. The group intended to have a "no face, just voice" concept by releasing the song with no accompanying music video and no promotional appearances on music shows as a way to appeal with their skills first.

On January 7, 2015 the group released the song "Missing You", featuring Zia. It was accompanied by a music video following the story of a woman and a man experiencing a bus accident. It featured an appearance by Dojin, making him the first member of the group to be revealed. Despite no promotional appearances, the digital release charted number one on several music sites.

2015: Official debut, Remember, and Beautiful Story 
On May 6, HeartB released the mini album Remember, which included their previously released singles, "Shine" and "Missing You", along with two new songs and the title track "Remember". The group promoted the song on various music shows and radio shows.

On July 31, HeartB announced a collaboration with Jung Jaewook for a remake of "With My Eyes Closed".

On September 14, the group released their second mini album Mi Story with the title track "Beautiful", which features the rapper Andup. Dojin participated in the writing of lyrics for all of the songs while Byulha participated in the composing of two. The group promoted the song on both radio shows and music shows, and did a number of busking events.

On November 9, the group released their fourth digital single "A Song For You".

Members
 Dojin (Hangul: 도진)
 Jinwook (김진욱)
 Chanyeong (찬영)
 Byulha (별하)

Discography

Extended plays

Singles

References

External links
 

K-pop music groups
Musical groups established in 2014
South Korean boy bands
2014 establishments in South Korea